Lawton Correctional Center is a privately managed prison for men located in Lawton, Comanche County, Oklahoma, operated by the GEO Group under contract with the Oklahoma Department of Corrections.

The facility was opened in 1998 and has a capacity of 2682 inmates held at a mix of medium and maximum security levels.

References

Prisons in Oklahoma
Private prisons in the United States
Buildings and structures in Comanche County, Oklahoma
GEO Group
1998 establishments in Oklahoma